Michael Joseph Kelly may refer to:
King Kelly (Michael Joseph Kelly, 1857–1894), baseball player
Michael Kelly (physicist) (born 1949), New Zealand-British physicist
Mike Kelley (baseball) (1875–1955), American baseball player and manager in the minor leagues
Mike Kelly (Australian politician) (born 1960), Australian politician
Michael Kelly (actor) (born 1969), American actor
Michael Joseph Kelly (American politician) (1850–1911), Irish-born American politician from Iowa

See also
Michael Kelly (disambiguation)